Daviesia umbellulata is a species of flowering plant in the family Fabaceae and is endemic to eastern Australia. It is a slender shrub with egg-shaped or linear phyllodes, and groups of up to six yellow to orange flowers with maroon markings.

Description

Taxonomy and naming
Daviesia umbellulata was first formally described in 1880 by James Edward Smith in the Annals of Botany from specimens collected at Port Jackson. The specific epithet (umbellulata)  means "umbel-like".

Distribution
This bitter-pea grows in the understorey of open forest, woodland or heath and mainly occurs near the coast between Shoalwater Bay in Queensland and Sydney, New South Wales with a disjunct population near Torrington.

References

umbellulata
Flora of New South Wales
Flora of Queensland
Plants described in 1805
Taxa named by James Edward Smith